Diana Donnelly (born 1989) is the former Miss Universe Ireland 2009.

Donnelly followed in the footsteps of her older sister Danielle by working as a model, before taking part in Miss Universe Ireland, as Miss Club 92. She represented her nation at the Miss Universe 2009 pageant on 23 August 2009 on the Bahamas.

References 

1986 births
Miss Universe 2009 contestants
Living people
Miss Universe Ireland winners
Beauty pageant contestants from Ireland